Dominoes is a family of tile-based games played with gaming pieces, commonly known as dominoes. Each domino is a rectangular tile, usually with a line dividing its face into two square ends. Each end is marked with a number of spots (also called pips or dots) or is blank. The backs of the tiles in a set are indistinguishable, either blank or having some common design. The gaming pieces make up a domino set, sometimes called a deck or pack.  The traditional European domino set consists of 28 tiles, also known as pieces, bones, rocks, stones, men, cards or just dominoes, featuring all combinations of spot counts between zero and six. A domino set is a generic gaming device, similar to playing cards or dice, in that a variety of games can be played with a set. Another form of entertainment using domino pieces is the practice of domino toppling.

The earliest mention of dominoes is from Song dynasty China found in the text Former Events in Wulin by Zhou Mi (1232–1298). Modern dominoes first appeared in Italy during the 18th century, but they differ from Chinese dominoes in a number of respects, and there is no confirmed link between the two. European dominoes may have developed independently, or Italian missionaries in China may have brought the game to Europe.

The name "domino" is probably derived from the resemblance to a kind of carnival costume worn during the Venetian Carnival, often consisting of a black-hooded robe and a white mask. Despite the coinage of the word "polyomino" as a generalization, there is no connection between the word "domino" and the number 2 in any language.
The most commonly played domino games are Domino Whist, Matador, and Muggins (All Fives). Other popular forms include Texas 42, Chicken Foot, Concentration, Double Fives, and Mexican Train. In Britain, the most popular league and pub game is Fives and Threes.

Dominoes have sometimes been used for divination, such as bone throwing in Chinese culture and in the African diaspora.

Construction and composition of domino sets
European-style dominoes are traditionally made of bone, silver lip ocean pearl oyster shell (mother of pearl), ivory, or a dark hardwood such as ebony, with contrasting black or white pips (inlaid or painted). Some sets feature the top half thickness in MOP, ivory, or bone, with the lower half in ebony. Alternatively, domino sets have been made from many different natural materials: stone (e.g., marble, granite or soapstone); other woods (e.g., ash, oak, redwood, and cedar); metals (e.g., brass or pewter); ceramic clay, or even frosted glass or crystal. These sets have a more novel look, and the often heavier weight makes them feel more substantial; also, such materials and the resulting products are usually much more expensive than polymer materials. 

Modern commercial domino sets are usually made of synthetic materials, such as ABS or polystyrene plastics, or Bakelite and other phenolic resins; many sets approximate the look and feel of ivory while others use colored or even translucent plastics to achieve a more contemporary look. Modern sets also commonly use a different color for the dots of each different end value (one-spots might have black pips while two-spots might be green, three red, etc.) to facilitate finding matching ends. Occasionally, one may find a domino set made of card stock like that for playing cards. Such sets are lightweight, compact, and inexpensive, and like cards are more susceptible to minor disturbances such as a sudden breeze. Sometimes, the tiles have a metal pin (called a spinner or pivot) in the middle.

The traditional domino set contains one unique piece for each possible combination of two ends with zero to six spots, and is known as a double-six set because the highest-value piece has six pips on each end (the "double six"). The spots from one to six are generally arranged as they are on six-sided dice, but because blank ends having no spots are used, seven faces are possible, allowing 28 unique pieces in a double-six set.

However, this is a relatively small number especially when playing with more than four people, so many domino sets are "extended" by introducing ends with greater numbers of spots, which increases the number of unique combinations of ends and thus of pieces. Each progressively larger set increases the maximum number of pips on an end by three; so the common extended sets are double-nine (55 tiles), double-12 (91 tiles), double-15 (136  tiles), and double-18 (190 tiles), which is the maximum in practice. Larger sets such as double-21 (253 tiles) could theoretically exist, but they seem to be extremely rare if not nonexistent, as that would be far more than is normally necessary for most domino games, even with eight players. As the set becomes larger, identifying the number of pips on each domino becomes more difficult, so some large domino sets use more readable Arabic numerals instead of pips.

History

In China, early "domino" tiles were functionally identical to playing cards. An identifiable version of Chinese dominoes developed in the 12th or 13th century. The oldest written mention of domino tiles in China comes from the Former Events in Wulin (i.e., the capital Hangzhou) written by the Yuan Dynasty (1271–1368) author Zhou Mi (1232–1298), who listed  pupai (gambling plaques or tiles), as well as dice as items sold by peddlers during the reign of Emperor Xiaozong of Song (r. 1162–1189). It isn't entirely clear that pupai here means domino tiles, but Andrew Lo (2000) argues that it plausibly does, as the same term is used two centuries later by the Ming author Lu Rong (1436–1494) in a context that clearly describes domino tiles (in regard to a story of a suitor who won a maiden's hand by drawing out four winning pupai from a set).
The earliest known manual written about dominoes is the Manual of the Xuanhe Period written by Qu You (1341–1427), but some Chinese scholars believe this manual is a forgery from a later time.

In the Encyclopedia of a Myriad of Treasures, Zhang Pu (1602–1641) described the game of laying out dominoes as pupai, although the character for pu had changed, yet retained a similar pronunciation. Traditional Chinese domino games include Tien Gow, Pai Gow, Che Deng, and others. The 32-piece Chinese domino set, made to represent each possible face of two thrown dice and thus have no blank faces, differs from the 28-piece domino set found in the West during the mid 18th century. Chinese dominoes with blank faces were known during the 17th century.
Each domino originally represented one of the 21 results of throwing two six-sided dice (2d6). One half of each domino is set with the pips from one die and the other half contains the pips from the second die. Chinese sets also introduce duplicates of some throws and divide the tiles into two suits: military and civil. Chinese dominoes are also longer than typical European ones.

The early 18th century saw the game of domino surfacing in Italy, before rapidly spreading to Austria, southern Germany and France. 
The game became a fad in France in the mid-18th century. The name domino does not appear before that time, being first recorded in 1771, in the Dictionnaire de Trévoux.
There are two earlier recorded meanings for the French word domino, one referring to the masquerades of the period, derived from the term for the hooded garment of a priest, the other referred to crude and brightly colored woodcuts on paper formerly popular among French peasants.  The way by which this word became the name of the game of domino remains unclear.
From France, the game was introduced to England by the late 1700s, purportedly brought in by French prisoners-of-war. It appears in American literature by the 1860s and variants soon spring up. In 1889, it was described as having spread worldwide, "but nowhere is it more popular than in the cafés of France and Belgium. From the outset, the European game was different from the Chinese one. European domino sets contain neither the military-civilian suit distinctions of Chinese dominoes nor the duplicates that went with them. Moreover, according to Michael Dummett, in the Chinese games it is only the identity of the tile that matters; there is no concept of matching. Instead, the basic set of 28 unique tiles contains seven additional pieces, six of them representing the values that result from throwing a single die with the other half of the tile left blank, and the seventh domino representing the blank-blank (0–0) combination. Subsequently 45-piece (double eight) sets appeared in Austria and, in recent times, 55-piece (double nine) and 91-piece (double twelve) sets have been produced.

The earliest game rules in Europe describe a simple block game for two or four players. Later French rules add the variant of Domino à la Pêche ("Fishing Domino"), an early draw game as well as a three-hand game with a pool. The first scoring game to be recorded was Fives, All Fives, or Cribbage Dominoes which appeared in 1863 and borrowed the features of scoring for combinations as well as the cribbage board from the card game of Cribbage. In 1864, The American Hoyle describes three new variants: Muggins, simply Fives with the addition of another Cribbage feature, the 'muggins rule'; Bergen; and Rounce; alongside the Block Game and Draw Game. All are still played today alongside games that have sprung up in the last 60 years such as Five Up, Mexican Train, and Chicken Foot, the last two taking advantage of the larger domino sets available.

The game is still played internationally, recognized as an "ingrained cultural activity within the Caribbean" but also popular with the Windrush generation (who have Caribbean heritage) in the UK.

In the U.S. state of Alabama, it is illegal to play dominoes on Sunday within the state.

Tiles and suits

Dominoes (also known as bones, cards, men, pieces or tiles), are normally twice as long as they are wide, which makes it easier to re-stack pieces after use. A domino usually features a line in the middle to divide it visually into two squares, called ends. The value of either side is the number of spots or pips. In the most common variant (double-six), the values range from six pips down to none or blank. The sum of the two values, i.e. the total number of pips, may be referred to as the rank or weight of a tile; a tile may be described as "heavier" than a "lighter" one that has fewer (or no) pips.

Tiles are generally named after their two values. For instance, the following are descriptions of the tile  bearing the values two and five:
 Deuce-five
 Five-deuce
 2-5
 5-2
A tile that has the same pips-value on each end is called a double or doublet, and is typically referred to as double-zero , double-one , and so on. Conversely, a tile bearing different values is called a single.

Every tile which features a given number is a member of the suit of that number. A single tile is a member of two suits: for example,  belongs both to the suit of threes and the suit of blanks, or 0 suit.

In some versions the doubles can be treated as an additional suit of doubles. In these versions, the  belongs both to the suit of sixes and the suit of doubles. However, the dominant approach is that each double belongs to only one suit. 

The most common domino sets commercially available are double six (with 28 tiles) and double nine (with 55 tiles). Larger sets exist and are popular for games involving several players or for players looking for long domino games.

The number of tiles in a double-n set obeys the following formula:

This formula can be simplified a little bit when  is made equal to the total number of doubles in the domino set:

The total number of pips in a double-n set is found by:
	
 i.e. the number of tiles multiplied by the maximum pip-count (n)

e.g. a 6-6 set has (7 x 8) / 2 = 56/2 = 28 tiles, the average number of pips per tile is 6 (range is from 0 to 12), giving a total pip count of 6 x 28 = 168

Rules 

The most popular type of play are layout games, which fall into two main categories, blocking games and scoring games.

 Most domino games are blocking games, where the objective is to empty one's hand while blocking the opponent's. In the end, a score may be determined by counting the pips in the losing players' hands.
 In scoring games, the scoring is different and happens mostly during game play, making it the principal objective.
 A popular version played predominantly in Singapore, referenced as Hector's Rules, allows for playing double tiles on opponents' hands and awards a bonus play of an additional tile immediately after playing a double tile. 
 If an opponent lays all their tiles on their turn, the game is a tie.

Blocking game
The most basic domino variant is for two players and requires a double-six set. The 28 tiles are shuffled face down and form the stock or boneyard. Each player draws seven tiles from the stock. Once the players begin drawing tiles, they are typically placed on-edge in front of the players, so players can see their own tiles, but not the value of their opponents' tiles. Players can thus see how many tiles remain in their opponents' hands at all times.

One player begins by downing (playing the first tile) one of their tiles. This tile starts the line of play, in which values of adjacent pairs of tile ends must match. The players alternately extend the line of play with one tile at one of its two ends; if a player is unable to place a valid tile, they must continue drawing tiles from the stock until they are able to place a tile. The game ends when one player wins by playing their last tile, or when the game is blocked because neither player can play. If that occurs, whoever caused the block receives all of the remaining player points not counting their own.

Scoring game
Players accrue points during game play for certain configurations, moves, or emptying one's hand. Most scoring games use variations of the draw game. If a player does not call "domino" before the tile is laid on the table, and another player says domino after the tile is laid, the first player must pick up an extra domino.

Draw game
In a draw game (blocking or scoring), players are additionally allowed to draw as many tiles as desired from the stock before playing a tile, and they are not allowed to pass before the stock is (nearly) empty. The score of a game is the number of pips in the losing player's hand plus the number of pips in the stock. Most rules prescribe that two tiles need to remain in the stock. The draw game is often referred to as simply "dominoes".

Adaptations of both games can accommodate more than two players, who may play individually or in teams.

Line of play

The line of play is the configuration of played tiles on the table. It starts with a single tile and typically grows in two opposite directions when players add matching tiles. In practice, players often play tiles at right angles when the line of play gets too close to the edge of the table.

The rules for the line of play often differ from one variant to another. In many rules, the doubles serve as spinners, i.e., they can be played on all four sides, causing the line of play to branch. Sometimes, the first tile is required to be a double, which serves as the only spinner. In some games such as Chicken Foot, all sides of a spinner must be occupied before anybody is allowed to play elsewhere. Matador has unusual rules for matching. Bendomino uses curved tiles, so one side of the line of play (or both) may be blocked for geometrical reasons.

In Mexican Train and other train games, the game starts with a spinner from which various trains branch off. Most trains are owned by a player and in most situations players are allowed to extend only their own train.

Scoring
In blocking games, scoring happens at the end of the game. After a player has emptied their hand, thereby winning the game for the team, the score consists of the total pip count of the losing team's hands. In some rules, the pip count of the remaining stock is added. If a game is blocked because no player can move, the winner is often determined by adding the pips in players' hands.

In scoring games, each individual can potentially add to the score. For example, in Bergen, players score two points whenever they cause a configuration in which both open ends have the same value and three points if additionally one open end is formed by a double. In Muggins, players score by ensuring the total pip count of the open ends is a multiple of a certain number. In variants of Muggins, the line of play may branch due to spinners. In the common U.S. variant known as Fives players score by making the open ends a multiple of five.

In British public houses and social clubs, a scoring version of "5s-and-3s" is used. The game is normally played in pairs (two against two) and is played as a series of "ends". In each "end", the objective is for players to attach a domino from their hand to one end of those already played so that the sum of the end tiles is divisible by five or three. One point is scored for each time five or three can be divided into the sum of the two tiles, i.e. four at one end and five at the other makes nine, which is divisible by three three times, resulting in three points. Double five at one end and five at the other makes 15, which is divisible by three five times (five points) and divisible by five three times (three points) for a total of eight points.

An "end" stops when one of the players is out, i.e., has played all of their tiles. In the event no player is able to empty their hand, then the player with the lowest domino left in hand is deemed to be out and scores one point. A game consists of any number of ends with points scored in the ends accumulating towards a total. The game ends when one of the pair's total score exceeds a set number of points. A running total score is often kept on a cribbage board. 5s-and-3s is played in a number of competitive leagues in the British Isles.

Card games using domino sets
Apart from the usual blocking and scoring games, also domino games of a very different character are played, such as solitaire or trick-taking games. Most of these are adaptations of card games and were once popular in certain areas to circumvent religious proscriptions against playing cards.
A very simple example is a Concentration variant played with a double-six set; two tiles are considered to match if their total pip count is 12.

A popular domino game in Texas is 42. The game is similar to the card game spades. It is played with four players paired into teams. Each player draws seven tiles, and the tiles are played into tricks. Each trick counts as one point, and any domino with a multiple of five dots counts toward the total of the hand. These 35 points of "five count" and seven tricks equals 42 points, hence the name.

Competitive play

Dominoes is played at a professional level, similar to poker. Numerous organisations and clubs of amateur domino players exist around the world. Some organizations organize international competitions. Examples include the Anglo Caribbean Dominoes League (ACDL) in the UK which includes over 40 clubs including the Brixton Immortals.

Dominoes in Unicode

Since April 2008, the character encoding standard Unicode includes characters that represent the double-six domino tiles. While a complete domino set has only 28 tiles, the Unicode set has "reversed" versions of the 21 tiles with different numbers on each end, a "back" image, and everything duplicated as horizontal and vertical orientations, for a total of 100 glyphs. Few fonts are known to support these glyphs.

Historical domino competitions
Col. Henry T. Titus vs. Capt. Clark Rice for the naming of Titusville, Florida.

See also

Domino games
Glossary of domino terms
List of domino games
Chinese dominoes

Other related articles
Domino effect
Domino theory
Domino show/Domino toppling
Polyominoes
Pub games
Tile-based game
List of world championships in mind sports

Notes

References

Sources

External links

 

 
Chinese inventions
Pub games
 
Gaming devices
Gambling games